Ali E'ta is an Iranian architect and reformist politician. He currently serves as a member of the City Council of Tehran.

References

Living people
Iranian architects
Union of Islamic Iran People Party politicians
Tehran Councillors 2017–
Year of birth missing (living people)
People from Ahvaz